Wolfram Theodor Hermann Freiherr von Soden (19 June 1908 in Berlin – 6 October 1996 in Münster) was a German Assyriologist of the post–World War II era.

Life and Work
Born in Berlin, Wolfram von Soden was a student of the ancient Semitic languages. He studied under the Jewish Assyriologist, Benno Landsberger at Leipzig. He received his doctorate in 1931 at the age of 23. The title of his dissertation is Der hymnisch-epische Dialekt des Akkadischen (The Hymnic-Epic Dialect of Akkadian). In 1936, he was appointed as Professor of Assyriology and Arabic studies, a new position at the University of Göttingen. After his mentor Landsberger was forced to leave Germany due to the racial policy of Nazi Germany, von Soden joined the Sturmabteilung in 1934. He was a radical German nationalist  and joined the NSDAP in 1937.

From 1939 to 1945, von Soden served in the military, primarily as a translator, and in 1940 this work prevented him from accepting the offer of a chair in Ancient Near Eastern studies at the Friedrich Wilhelm University in Berlin. Von Soden published works that implicitly supported Nazi cultural and racial policy.

Following the Second World War, von Soden's former activities as a member of the Nazi Party initially barred his reentry to the teaching profession. However, because of his abilities and a recommendation from Benno Landsberger, von Soden was appointed to an academic position at the University of Vienna in 1954. In 1961, he accepted the offer of a professorship at Münster, where he served as director of the Oriental Seminar until his retirement in 1976. After his death in 1996, he left his scholarly library to the newly revived Institute for Near Eastern Studies at the University of Leipzig, where he earned his doctorate.

Scholarship

After World War II, von Soden became a prominent scholar in the world of ancient Semitic languages and his scholarship greatly influenced his field during the Post-war era. He was a member of the "History of Religions" (Religionsgeschichte) school at the University of Göttingen, and disproved of the long-standing claim that the Babylonians had believed in their creator god, Marduk, as a "dying, rising god". Instead, he was able to show that the texts that purveyed this view were polemical Assyrian works deriding the chief god of their chief rival state. 

Von Soden's philological works, particularly the Akkadisches Handwörterbuch (AHW), in which the Dutch scholar Rykle Borger assisted, laid the basis for the detailed philological contributions that later appeared in the Chicago Assyrian Dictionary. His Grundriss Akkadischer Grammatik (GAG) and the AHW are considered the foundational works of Assyriology today and establish von Soden as the dean of ancient Near Eastern Studies in the world.

Scholarly Controversy
Von Soden's work has been alleged to promote the Nazi ideology. His early works, especially 'Der Aufstieg des Assyrreiches als geschichtliches Problem' from 1937, appear to promote "racist concepts of Aryan superiority" over the influence of Semitic culture. 

Another example of this can be found in 'Leistung und Grenze sumerischer und babylonischer Wissenschaft' (1936). In the 1965 edition, page 122, the conclusion is: “that science in the strict sense of the word could only take shape under the special conditions given by the Indo-European Greeks and Indians. In the 1936 edition, page 556, the conclusion is: “that science in the strict sense of the word is something that could only be created by the Indo-Europeans determined by the Nordic race.  

His Einführung in die Altorientalistik (1985) also contains an obsession with skin colour: "about the presumably always light-skinned inhabitants of the Near East during the Copper Age" (p. 14).

Works (partial)
Das akkadische Syllabar (1948, rev. 1967, 1976, 1991)
Grundriss der akkadischen Grammatik (1952)
Das Gilgamesch-Epos (1958, with Albert Schott)
Akkadisches Handwörterbuch (1965–1981, 3 vols)
Das akkadisch-hethitische Vokabular KBo I 44+KBo XIII 1 (1968, with Heinrich Otten)
Einführung in die Altorientalistik (1985); translated (by Donald G. Schley) into English as The Ancient Orient: An Introduction to the Study of the Ancient Near East. Grand Rapids: Eerdmans, 1994.

References

 Rykle Borger, "Wolfram von Soden". In: Archiv für Orientforschung 44/45, 1997/98, pp. 588–594.
 Gary Beckman, "von Soden, Wolfram (1908-1996). In 'The Encyclopedia of Ancient History' 2018, pp.1.
 Jakob Flygare, "Assyriology in Nazi Germany: the Case of Wolfram von Soden." In 'Perspectives on the History of Ancient Near Eastern Studies.' 2020, p. 44-60. 

1908 births
1996 deaths
Linguists from Germany
German Assyriologists
Academic staff of the University of Münster
Writers from Berlin
German male non-fiction writers
20th-century linguists
Corresponding Fellows of the British Academy